Hacıəhmədoba (also, Hajiahmedoba and Hajyahmedoba) is a village in the Khachmaz District of Azerbaijan. The village forms part of the municipality of Ahmedoba.

References

 

Populated places in Khachmaz District